Mina (Spanish for "Mine") is an unincorporated community in Mendocino County, California.

A post office operated at Mina from 1914 to 1938.

References

Unincorporated communities in California
Unincorporated communities in Mendocino County, California